Cicindela purpurea, known generally as the purple tiger beetle or cow path tiger beetle, is a species of flashy tiger beetle in the family Carabidae. It is found in North America.

Subspecies
These five subspecies belong to the species Cicindela purpurea:
 Cicindela purpurea audubonii LeConte, 1845 (Audubon's tiger beetle)
 Cicindela purpurea cimarrona LeConte, 1868 (cimarron tiger beetle)
 Cicindela purpurea hatchi Leffler, 1980 (Hatch's tiger beetle)
 Cicindela purpurea lauta Casey, 1897
 Cicindela purpurea purpurea Olivier, 1790 (cow path tiger beetle)

References

Further reading

 
 

purpurea
Articles created by Qbugbot
Beetles described in 1790
Beetles of North America